Donald Sydney Sutherland (20 April 1890 – 17 November 1957) was an Australian rules footballer who played with Essendon in the Victorian Football League (VFL).

He later played with Hawthorn in the Victorian Football Association.

Notes

External links 

1890 births
1957 deaths
Australian rules footballers from Victoria (Australia)
Essendon Football Club players
Yarraville Football Club players
Hawthorn Football Club (VFA) players
Australian military personnel of World War I